Chronic poverty is a phenomenon whereby an individual or group is in a state of poverty over extended period of time. While determining both the implicit poverty line and the duration needed to be considered long-term is debated, the identification of this kind of poverty is considered important because it may require different policies than those needed for addressing transient poverty.

See also 
Chronic Poverty Research Centre
Cycle of poverty
Extreme poverty
Trans poverty

References

Measurements and definitions of poverty